  
The Düsseldorf Stadtbahn, together with the Rhine-Ruhr S-Bahn and the Düsseldorf Straßenbahn (Tram), is the backbone of the public transport system of Düsseldorf, Germany, and is integrated in the Rhine-Ruhr Stadtbahn network. The Stadtbahn officially opened on 6 August 1988 and is operated by Rheinbahn AG.

Current lines 
U70 is a rush-hour-only express line. It operates the same route as the U76, however does not stop at all stations. U77 is not operated on sundays or holidays. U83 is not operated on weekends.
The lines U80-U82 are currently in planning and constructions are set to start in late 2020/early 2021.

Future expansion

In late 2019 construction work for the new U81 started. The first section will connect the main station (Düsseldorf Hauptbahnhof) and the airport. Opening of this section is scheduled for 2024 and will also enable connections between the arena and the airport.

Rolling Stock
There are a total of 135 trainsets for the Düsseldorf Stadtbahn. There are 103 six-axle articulated tramsets (B80), which are operated on the lines U70 and U74-U79 as well as 32 eight-axle articulated tramsets (GT8SU)., which are mostly found on the lines U75 and U77 and occasionally on line U74. Both the B80 and the GT8SU have a floor at around 90 cm above the tracks. The B80 sets were delivered in two batches: the first was in 1981 and consisted of 12 tramsets with vehicle bodies made of Steel and the second one was delivered between 1985 and 1993, with the remaining 92 tramsets, these had vehicle bodies made of Aluminium. The two Badges can be distuingished by the sets' service numbers: for the first Badge the numbers will be a "40xx" and for the second one either a "41xx" or "42xx". After an Accident in 2001, one of the sets (numbered 4001) was deemed damaged beyond repair and scrapped. The GT8SU sets were originally purchased by the Rheinbahn in 1973 as low-floor GT8S sets for the Tram network and modified for use on the Stadtbahn in 1981.  Furthermore, the lines U71-U73 and U83 are operated by eight-axle trainsets of type NF8U, which have a floor height of 30 cm above the tracks. Starting from 2022, a total of 59 HF6 tramsets manufactured by Alstom subsidiary Bombardier Transportation are delivered to replace the older GT8SU units.

See also

 Trams in Düsseldorf
 Rhine-Ruhr S-Bahn
 Rhein-Ruhr Stadtbahn
 Verkehrsverbund Rhein-Ruhr
 List of rapid transit systems

References

Inline citations

Books
 Dieter Höltge: Straßen- und Stadtbahnen in Deutschland Band 4: Ruhrgebiet von Dortmund bis Duisburg, EK-Verlag, 1994, .
 Landeshauptstadt Düsseldorf Amt für Verkehrsmanagement: Nahverkehrsplan 2002–2007. Veröffentlichung, Düsseldorf 2003
 Hans G. Nolden: Die Düsseldorfer Straßenbahn. GeraMond Verlag, München 1998, .
 Axel Schild, Dieter Waltking: Die Rheinbahn Stadtverkehr in und um Düsseldorf. alba, Düsseldorf 1996, .
 Richard Jacobi, Dieter Zeh: Die Geschichte der Düsseldorfer Straßenbahn Von der Pferdetram zur Stadtbahn. EK-Verlag, Freiburg 1995, .
 Friedhelm Blennemann: U-Bahnen und Stadtbahnen in Deutschland Planung Bau Betrieb. alba, Düsseldorf 1975, .
 Fritz D. Kegel: U-Bahnen in Deutschland Planung Bau Betrieb. alba, Düsseldorf 1971.
 Robert Schwandl: Schnellbahnen in Deutschland. Robert Schwandl Verlag, Berlin 2007, .

External links

 Rheinbahn - official site 
 Rheinbahn - official site 
 Düsseldorf network map (pdf) 
 Information from duesseldorf.de
 Private homepage at Rhein-Ruhr Stadtbahn
 U-Bahn and Stadtbahn in Germany
 Metro Bits: Photosession of the Rhein-Ruhr Stadtbahn

Transport in Düsseldorf
Companies based in Düsseldorf
Light rail in Germany
Tram transport in Germany
Underground rapid transit in Germany
1988 establishments in West Germany